Rift Valley Technical Training institute (RVTTI) is a public technical training institute located in the highland city of Eldoret, Kenya. It is one of the Technical Training Institutes in Kenya. The institution offers Artisan,  Craft, Diploma and Higher Diploma Courses with bias to practical industrial applications.

History
The institution started in 1962 as a technical and trade school. In 1979, it was given high school status and began A- level courses in mathematics, physics and chemistry. In 1986, the school was elevated further to become the regions first technical training institute. The Institution has continuously grown and in recognition to this sustained prosperity, it was nominated in 2013 to be an East African Community Center of Excellence in TVET In 2016, the institution became a UNESCO-UNEVOC network centre, the only TVET institution to have such recognition in East and Central Africa RVTTI was chosen among the pilot institutions for the Competency-based education and training programme(CBET) and had the first cohort join three programmes in January 2019

Research
Since 2012 RVTTI annually holds an International conference with themes surrounding Technical and Vocational Education. It also publishes two journals namely;Kenya Journal of Technical and Vocational Education and Training(KJ-TVET) and Africa Journal of Technical and Vocational Education and Training (AfriTVET).

Departments 
Rift Valley Technical Training institute(RVTTI), has 8 Admitting departments. These are
 Mechanical Engineering Department
 Building and Civil Engineering Department
 Business and Liberal Studies Department
 Electrical and Electronics Engineering Department
 Hospitality and Institutional Management Department
 Information Communication Technology Department
 Health and Applied Sciences Department
 Department of Agriculture

Directorates
 Industrial Attachment and Liaison Center
 ICT Infrastructure
 Performance Contracting
 Quality and Information Security Management
 Examination Department
 Research Innovation and Development
 e-Learning and External linkages

Facilities
The institution has numerous facilities catering for the various technical programs being offered. These include a Sizable State of art Library Complex with a seating capacity of 700, an E-library with seating capacity of 60, Three Conference Halls, Three Restaurants, Several Labs for Bio Chemical Practicals, ICT, Mechanical Engineering, Automotive Engineering, Electrical Engineering, Building and Civil engineering, and several lecture rooms some equipped with Smart Boards. The institution also has two smart classrooms which offer advanced engineering exposure in the fields of Mechatronics and Renewable energy. The smart classrooms where equipped by Devotra with funding from the ministry of education.

The institution also has facilities for sports including a standard sized football pitch, a basketball Court, a volleyball pitch, a rugby pitch, and a netball pitch.

Campuses
Main Campus, Eldoret, Opposite KCC
TIaty Campus

See also
 African Rift Valley
 Education in Kenya
 List of universities and colleges in Kenya
 Universities in Kenya
 Vocational education

References

External links 
 Rift Valley Technical Training Institute official site
 County sponsors 600 students to study technical courses
 MCAs want more courses offered under sponsorship project
 Banks urged to sponsor technical training students
 Ministry plans to establish 130 new technical institutions at Sh5.3 billion

Education in Kenya
Universities in Kenya
1962 establishments in Kenya
Educational institutions established in 1962